Arthur Reinhardt (17 April 1893 – 16 December 1973) was a German actor. He appeared in more than sixty films from 1927 to 1955.

Selected filmography

References

External links 

1893 births
1973 deaths
German male film actors